Tampico is a 1944 drama/war film directed by Lothar Mendes and starring Edward G. Robinson, Lynn Bari, Victor McLaglen, Marc Lawrence, and Mona Maris. It was released by 20th Century Fox.

Plot

Capt. Bart Manson is the captain of an oil tanker during World War II, who rescues Katherine Hall when her ship is sunk by a German U-boat. The couple marry, but Manson's ship is subsequently sunk as well. Hall becomes a prime suspect for involvement as she was carrying no identification when rescued. However Manson later discovers that his First Mate Fred Adamson is in fact a German agent responsible for the sinking, and Hall is cleared of any culpability.

Cast
 Edward G. Robinson as Capt. Bart Manson
 Lynn Bari as Katherine 'Kathy' Hall
 Victor McLaglen as Fred Adamson
 Robert Bailey as Second Mate Watson
 Marc Lawrence as Valdez
 Edward James Ballantine as Silhouette Man
 Mona Maris as Dolores Garcia
 Tonio Selwart as Kruger
 Ann Corcoran as Karla

References

External links

 
 
 
 

1944 films
1940s war drama films
American war drama films
American black-and-white films
Films directed by Lothar Mendes
Films scored by David Raksin
Seafaring films
World War II films made in wartime
American World War II films
20th Century Fox films
1944 drama films
1940s English-language films